Dasho Lhendup Dorji (6 October 1935 – 15 April 2007) was a member of the Dorji family of Bhutan. He was also the brother of the Queen of Bhutan, Ashi Kesang choden and uncle to the fourth king of Bhutan, King Jigme Singye Wangchuck. He served as acting Lyonchen (Prime Minister) following the assassination of his brother, Lyonchen Jigme Palden Dorji, on April 5, 1964.  

Lhendup Dorji was born to Gongzim Raja Sonam Topgay Dorji and Princess Rani Chuni Wangmo of Sikkim on October 6, 1935 at Bhutan House, Kalimpong, India. He became the first Bhutanese to study in the United States attending Cornell University, which he graduated from in 1959. Dorji was an avid hunter and excelled in athletics, such as boxing, golf, and tennis. He returned to Bhutan from the United States and started out measuring land. He spent months traveling around Bhutan calculating the terrain by hand using the most readily available measuring systems. He later served as Postmaster General, Paro Thrimpon, Deputy and later Secretary General of the country's Development Wing.

He is referenced by Shirley MacLaine in her book, "Don't Fall Off the Mountain", which documents a visit she made to Bhutan during which she met him. Lhendup also sometimes made his own approximation of Bhutanese curry.

Dorji's nephew, Jigme Singye Wangchuck, went on to become the fourth Dragon King of Bhutan. On April 15, 2007 he died of cancer in Lungtenphu, Thimphu.

Honours 
  :
  The Royal Red Scarf (1958).
  King Jigme Singye Investiture Medal (2 June 1974).
  Commemorative Silver Jubilee Medal of King Jigme Singye (2 June 1999).

Ancestry

See also
List of prime ministers of Bhutan
House of Wangchuck

References

External links
Bhutan Political System
The Royal Family of Bhutan

1935 births
2007 deaths
Cornell University alumni
Prime Ministers of Bhutan
Lhendup Dorji